What's Up is the final album by American jazz trumpeter Bill Hardman which was recorded in Copenhagen in 1989 and released on the Danish SteepleChase label.

Track listing
 "Fuller Up" (Mickey Tucker) − 5:23
 "I Should Care" (Axel Stordahl, Paul Weston, Sammy Cahn) − 9:20
 "Whisper Not" (Benny Golson) − 8:17
 "Straight Ahead" (Kenny Dorham) − 10:28 Additional track on CD release
 "P.B." (Bill Hardman) − 7:08
 "Like Someone in Love" (Jimmy Van Heusen, Johnny Burke) − 8:54
 "Yo What's Up" (Tucker) − 7:40
 "Room's Blues" (Tucker) − 10:04 Additional track on CD release

Personnel 
Bill Hardman − trumpet
Junior Cook − tenor saxophone
Robin Eubanks − trombone
Mickey Tucker − piano 
Paul Brown − bass
Leroy Williams − drums

References 

1989 albums
Bill Hardman albums
SteepleChase Records albums